Charles Peterson (born 1964 in Longview, Washington) is an American photographer well known for his work with the Seattle independent record label Sub Pop and for capturing the then-newly emerging grunge scene in images. His photos are presented in the movie Kurt Cobain: About a Son.

Peterson is known for depicting the rise of the Pacific Northwest underground music scene in the late 1980s to early 1990s. Visually, he is known for his trademark full-frame, non-cropped images. Reviews about his work include the following, "Peterson is known for his action-packed, sometimes partially blurred black-and-white shots taken with a wide-angle lens.

Peterson said, "The Seattle audiences were entertaining. I didn't want to just get a head shot of the lead singer. I wanted to get the experience, make you actually feel like you're there. ... I like the composition part of shooting. The way my eyes and brain work together -- I'm constantly composing with or without a camera."

Private life 
Peterson's introduction to photography was as a youngster watching his uncle developing film. He attended Bothell High and his photographs were in the school newspaper and yearbook.  His livelihood today mainly comes from licensing his photographs and books.  He does some commercial shoots but does not photograph many bands.

He lives in Seattle with his wife, son Felix and daughter Leica.

Publications
Touch Me I'm Sick, by Jennie Boddy (Author), Eddie Vedder (Author, Introduction), Charles Peterson  (Photographer)(PowerHouse, 2003) 
Screaming Life : A Chronicle of the Seattle Music Scene, Charles Peterson  (Author, Photographer) (Harper Collins, 1995)
Pearl Jam: Place/Date, Charles Peterson  (Author), Lance Mercer (Author) (Rizzoli/Vitalogy, 1997)
Cypher, Jeff Chang (Author), Charles Peterson  (Photographer), (PowerHouse Books 2008)

Exhibitions
Chrysler Museum of Art, Norfolk Virginia, February–May 2005 
Seattle's Experience Music Project (EMP) 
Galerie Chappe, Paris "Kurt Cobain, About A Son" November 2008 
Experiencing Nirvana (2014) Camden, UK

Films
 All apologies: Kurt Cobain 10 years (2006)
 The Last 48 hours of Kurt Cobain (2007)
 Seven ages of rock (2007)
Hype! (1996)
Photographs were used in Cobain: Montage of Heck (2015)
Too young to die: Kurt Cobain (2012)

References

External links 
 

1964 births
Living people
People from Longview, Washington
American photographers
University of Washington alumni
Music of the Pacific Northwest